Caeli McKay (born 25 June 1999) is a Canadian diver. She competed in the women's 10 metre platform event at the 2019 World Aquatics Championships. In June 2021, she qualified to represent Canada at the 2020 Summer Olympics.

References

External links
 

1999 births
Living people
Canadian female divers
Divers from Calgary
Commonwealth Games medallists in diving
Commonwealth Games silver medallists for Canada
Commonwealth Games bronze medallists for Canada
Divers at the 2018 Commonwealth Games
Divers at the 2022 Commonwealth Games
Pan American Games medalists in diving
Pan American Games gold medalists for Canada
Pan American Games silver medalists for Canada
Divers at the 2019 Pan American Games
Medalists at the 2019 Pan American Games
Divers at the 2020 Summer Olympics
Olympic divers of Canada
21st-century Canadian women
Medallists at the 2018 Commonwealth Games
Medallists at the 2022 Commonwealth Games